The Catalina mountain snail (Radiocentrum avalonense) is a species of small air-breathing land snail, terrestrial pulmonate gastropod mollusk in the family Oreohelicidae.

This species is endemic to the United States.

References

Oreohelicidae
Endemic fauna of the United States
Critically endangered fauna of the United States
Gastropods described in 1905
Taxonomy articles created by Polbot